NGC 1426 is an elliptical galaxy approximately 59 million light-years away from Earth in the constellation of Eridanus. It was discovered by William Herschel in December 9, 1784.

NGC 1426 is a member of the Eridanus Cluster.

See also 
 Elliptical galaxy 
 List of NGC objects (1001–2000)
 Eridanus (constellation)

References

External links 
 
 
 SEDS

Elliptical galaxies
Eridanus (constellation)
1426
13638
Astronomical objects discovered in 1784
Discoveries by William Herschel
Eridanus Group